5000 Poems is an album by American jazz trombonist Steve Swell, which was recorded in 2007 and released on the Polish Not Two label. It was the fourth release by Slammin' the Infinite and the second as a quintet with pianist John Blum. The title takes its name from an essay by Walt Whitman.

Reception
The All About Jazz review by John Sharpe states:

Track listing
All compositions by Steve Swell
"Not Their Kind" - 8:32
"Sketch #1" - 18:25
"Where Are the Heartfelt?" - 12:28
"My Myth of Perfection" - 14:20
"The Only Way...Out" - 15:33
"Sketch #2" - 24:01
"The Darkness Afoot" - 13:46

Personnel
Steve Swell - trombone
Sabir Mateen - alto sax, tenor sax, clarinet, alto clarinet, flute
John Blum  - piano
Matthew Heyner - bass
Klaus Kugel  - drums

References

Sources

2010 albums
Steve Swell albums